Australia competed at the 2004 Summer Olympics in Athens, Greece from 13 to 29 August 2004. Australian athletes have competed in every Summer Olympic Games of the modern era. The Australian Olympic Committee sent a total of 470 athletes (268 men and 202 women) to the Games to compete in 29 sports.

Australia finished the Athens Games having won a total of 50 medals, including 17 gold, the most gold medals to date although this was equalled in Tokyo 2020. Its strongest sports were swimming, cycling, diving, and rowing.

Medalists

Archery 

Men

Women

Athletics 

Men
Track & road events

Field events

Women
Track & road events

Field events

Combined events – Heptathlon

Badminton 

Australia sent a team of eight badminton players to Athens. None of them surpassed the first round of elimination.

Men

Women

Mixed

Baseball 

Australia advanced into the final game after defeating a Japanese team made up of professional players in Semifinal 1–0. Lost to Cuba in Final 2–6.

Team Roster
Manager: 24 - Jon Deeble.

Coaches: 2 - Tony Harris, 33 - Paul Elliott, 34 - Philip Dale.

Preliminary Round

15 August

August 16

August 17

August 18

August 20

August 21

August 22

Semifinals
24 August

Gold Medal Final
25 August

 Won Silver Medal

Basketball 

Australia has qualified both men's and women's teams.

 Men's team event – 1 team of 12 players
 Women's team event – 1 team of 12 players

Men's tournament

Roster

Group play

Classification round (9th–10th place)

Women's tournament

Roster

Group play

Quarterfinal

Semifinal

Gold Medal Final

 Won Silver Medal

Boxing 

Australia has qualified nine boxers for the Olympics based on their performances from the Oceanian Qualification Tournament.

Canoeing

Slalom

Sprint
Men

Women

Qualification Legend: Q = Qualify to final; q = Qualify to semifinal

Cycling

Road
Men

Women

Track
Sprint

Pursuit

Time trial

Keirin

Omnium

Mountain biking

Diving 

Men

Women

Equestrian

Dressage

Eventing

"#" indicates that the score of this rider does not count in the team competition, since only the best three results of a team are counted.

Show jumping

Fencing

Men

Women

Field hockey

Australia qualified a men's and a women's team.  Each team had 16 athletes with two reserves.

Men's tournament

Roster

Group play

Semifinals

Gold Medal Final

 Won Gold Medal

Women's tournament

Roster

Group play

Fifth-Eighth Place Semifinal

Fifth Place Final

Football

Men's tournament

Roster

Group play

Quarterfinal

Women's tournament

Roster

Group play

Quarterfinal

Gymnastics

Artistic
Australia qualified a women's team and an individual man.
Men

Women
Team

* Monette Russo supposedly qualified for the all-around final, but later withdrew because of injury.

Individual finals

Rhythmic

Trampoline

Judo

Australia has qualified a total of twelve judoka (seven men and five women) for the Games.

Men

Women

Modern pentathlon

Based on the results from the 2003 Asian/Oceanian Championships, 1996 Olympic champion Alexander Parygin and Eszter Hortobagyi have qualified for modern pentathlon events in Athens. Parygin also previously competed for Kazakhstan.

Rowing

Men

Women

Qualification Legend: FA=Final A (medal); FB=Final B (non-medal); FC=Final C (non-medal); FD=Final D (non-medal); FE=Final E (non-medal); FF=Final F (non-medal); SA/B=Semifinals A/B; SC/D=Semifinals C/D; SE/F=Semifinals E/F; R=Repechage

Sailing

Men

Women

Open

M = Medal race; OCS = On course side of the starting line; DSQ = Disqualified; DNF = Did not finish; DNS= Did not start; RDG = Redress given

Shooting 

Men

Women

Softball 

Team Roster

Preliminary Round

14 August

15 August

16 August

17 August

18 August

19 August

20 August

Semifinal, 22 August

Bronze Medal Game, 22 August

 Won Silver Medal

Swimming 

Australian swimmers earned qualifying standards in the following events (up to a maximum of 2 swimmers in each event at the A-standard time, and 1 at the B-standard time):

Men

* Swimmers who participated in the heats only and received medals.

Women

* Swimmers who participated in the heats only and received medals.

Synchronized swimming

Table tennis

Men

Women

Taekwondo

Australia has qualified four taekwondo practitioners in their respective divisions.

Tennis

Men

Women

Triathlon

Volleyball

Beach

Indoor

Men's tournament

Australian men's team qualified after finishing second at the FIVB World Olympic Qualification Tournament in Tokyo.
Roster

Group play

Water polo

Men's tournament

Roster

Group play

7th-12th Classification Quarterfinal

7th-10th Classification Semifinal

9th-10th Classification Final

Women's tournament

Roster

Group play

Semifinal

Bronze Medal Match

Weightlifting

Wrestling 

Men's freestyle

See also
 Australia at the 2002 Commonwealth Games
 Australia at the 2004 Summer Paralympics
 Australia at the 2006 Commonwealth Games

References

External links
 Official website – Australian Olympic Team

Nations at the 2004 Summer Olympics
2004
Summer Olympics